Leonard Brown Sossamon Jr. is an American real estate developer, county administrator, and politician. He was appointed to the North Carolina House of Representatives in 2000 but lost election to a full term by Linda P. Johnson later that year.

Sossamon served as county administrator of Hernando County, Florida from 2012 to 2019.

Electoral history

2000

References

External links
Profile at Vote Smart

Living people
Democratic Party members of the North Carolina House of Representatives
21st-century American politicians
Year of birth missing (living people)